Vecpils Parish is an administrative unit of South Kurzeme Municipality, Latvia. The parish has a population of 529 (as of 1/07/2010) and covers an area of 80.2 km2.

Villages of Vecpils parish 
 Dižilmāja
 Dižstroķi
 Lekši
 Mazilmāja
 Mazlāņi
 Mazstroķi
 Vecpils (Dižlāņi)

History 
Dižilmāja manor (Gut Groß-Ilmajen, Dižilmāja), Dižlāņi manor (Gut Groß-Lahnen, Vecpils (Vecpils parish)) was historically located in the territory of modern Vecpils parish, Gut Kleß-Strohken Manor (Gut Groß-Strohken), Gut Klein-Ilmajen Manor, Gut Klein-Lahnen Manor, Little layers), Vecpils manor (Gut Altenburg).

Vecpils Parish was established around 1890, when Vecpils, Lāņi, Stroķi, Lekši and Ilmāja manor parishes were united. In 1935, the area of the parish was 97.3 km2. In 1945, Vecpils and Stroķu village councils were established in the parish, but in 1949 the parish was liquidated. In 1954, the village of Stroķi was added to the village of Vecpils. In 1958, a part of Aizpute village was added to Vecpils village, but part of Vecpils village was included in Aizpute village. In 1968, part of the territory of the parish was added to Kalvenes village. The village was reorganized into a parish in 1990.  From 2009 until 2021, Vecpils Parish was part of the former Durbe municipality.

Cultural monuments 
 Vecpils Catholic Church 
 Ilmaja Lutheran Church
 Vecpils castle mound
 An ancient cemetery appears
 Dižlāņu Idol Hill - a place of worship
 Big burial ancient burial ground

References 

Parishes of Latvia
South Kurzeme Municipality
Courland